Pratul Mukhopadhyay (born 1942) is a Bengali singer, creative artist and songwriter. He is the writer and the singer of the famous Bengali song Ami Banglay Gan Gai and Dinga Bhashao Sagore. He was a playback singer in the Bengali film Gosaibaganer Bhoot.

Works

Albums 
 Pathorey Pathorey Naachey Aagun (1988) with various artists.
 Jete Hobey (1994)
 Ootho Hey (1994)
 Kuttus Kottas (1997)
 Swapner Pheriwala (2000) with various artists
 Tomake Dekhchhilam (2000)
 Swapanpurey (2002)
 Aanek Natun Bandhu Hok (2004) with other artists
 Haw Jaw Baw Raw Law of Sukumar Ray (2004) Recitation and text reading
 Dui Kanur Upakshyan (2005) Recitation and text reading with various artists
 Aandhar Naame (2007)

Documentaries 
 Songs of Pratul Mukhopadhyay – Produced by Anweshan, Directed by Manas Bhowmik
 Dinga Bhasao  – Produced by Samakalin Chalchitra

Books 
 Pratul Mukhopadhyayer Nirbachito Gaan (Selected Songs of Pratul Mukhopadhyay)
 Shakti-Rajniti (Power Politics)

References

Citations

Sources 
 Jete Hobey

External links 
 

1942 births
Bengali singers
Living people
Indian male playback singers
Indian male singer-songwriters
Indian singer-songwriters
Singers from Kolkata